Peter Gansevoort Ten Eyck (November 7, 1873 – September 2, 1944) was an American politician who served as a U.S. representative from New York from 1913 to 1915 and again from 1921 to 1923. He was a member of the Democratic Party.

Early life
Born in Bethlehem, Albany County to the Dutch American Ten Eyck family, he was educated in the common schools in Normansville, at The Albany Academy, and at the Rensselaer Polytechnic Institute.

Professional career
He engaged in civil and signal engineering for fifteen years and was a signal engineer for the New York Central Lines. He was chief engineer of the Federal Railway Signal Co. in 1903 and was later its vice president and general manager.

Military career
He served seven years in the New York National Guard as a member of the 3rd Signal Corps, a unit of the 3rd Brigade.

Political career
Ten Eyck was elected as a Democrat to the 63rd United States Congress, holding office from March 4, 1913 to March 3, 1915. He was an unsuccessful candidate for reelection in 1914 to the 64th United States Congress, and was a delegate to the 1920 Democratic National Convention.

He was elected to the 67th United States Congress, holding office from March 4, 1921 to March 3, 1923. Ten Eyck declined to be a candidate for renomination in 1922 and operated Indian Ladder Farms, an agricultural enterprise in Altamont which is still owned by his family.  He died in Altamont on September 2, 1944 and was buried at Albany Rural Cemetery.

References

External links 

1873 births
1944 deaths
American people of Dutch descent
Burials at Albany Rural Cemetery
Democratic Party members of the United States House of Representatives from New York (state)
People from Bethlehem, New York
Rensselaer Polytechnic Institute alumni
Peter Gansevoort
The Albany Academy alumni